Set Your Body Free is the second solo album by Swedish pop/dance singer Danny Saucedo. It was released on 24 December 2008. The first single "Radio" reached number one on the Swedish Single Chart, where it remained for two weeks. The album was released by Sony Music. The single "Need to Know" peaked att number 39 on the chart, while "All on you" peaked at number 17. The single "Emely" did not enter the chart.

Track listing
Credits adapted from Spotify.

Critical reception 
The album received generally mixed reviews from Swedish music critics. Jenny Seth of Aftonbladet gave the album a positive review, calling it one of the best albums of the year (2008). She praised the production as well as the energy that Saucedo expresses on the album. Writing for Gefle Dagblad, Mikael Forsell praised Saucedo for his interpretation of the Disco genre on the album, although saying that some songs didn't have the same "high class" as other songs on the record.

Release history
The album was released on Christmas Eve 2008 in Sweden both digitally and physically.

Chart performance
The album debuted at number two on the Swedish Albums Chart upon release. After its entering, it remained for 4 more weeks charting at 36, 50, 51 & 52, respectively.

References

2008 albums
Danny Saucedo albums